Dimke is a German surname. Notable people with the surname include:

Derek Dimke (born 1990), American football placekicker 
Harold Dimke (born 1949), German rower
Mary K. Dimke (born 1977/78), American judge

See also
Dumke
Imke

German-language surnames